The year 1899 in archaeology involved some significant excavations.

Events
 31 December: A large standing stone at Stonehenge falls over.

Explorations
 Tell Halaf, Syria, discovered by Max von Oppenheim.

Excavations
 Excavations of Babylon by Deutsche Orient-Gesellschaft directed by Robert Koldewey begin.
 Excavation of Anglo-Saxon town wall in Clarendon Quadrangle of Bodleian Library, Broad Street, Oxford, England.

Finds
 Shang dynasty oracle bones from the site of Yinxu are discovered by Wang Yiron, director of the Imperial College of China.
 Roman Empire-related silver plate is found near Qalagah, Azerbaijan.
 Södermanland runic inscription 140.
 Sand quarriers find over 800 fragmentary Neanderthal remains representing at least 12 and likely as many as 70 individuals on the hill of Hušnjakovo in Krapina in the Austro-Hungarian Empire (modern-day Croatia), identified by Dragutin Gorjanović-Kramberger.

Publications
 John Myres - A catalogue of the Cyprus museum, with a chronicle of excavations undertaken since the British occupation, and introductory notes on Cypriote archaeology.
 Ernest-Théodore Hamy - article on the Dumbarton Oaks birthing figure.

Births
 30 December: Helge Ingstad, Norwegian explorer; co-discoverer of Viking artifacts at L'Anse aux Meadows (d. 2001).
 William Duncan Strong, American archaeologist and anthropologist (d. 1962).

See also
 List of years in archaeology
 1898 in archaeology
 1900 in archaeology

References

Archaeology, 1899 In
Archaeology by year
1890s in science
Archaeology, 1899 In